Tennessee's 30th Senate district is one of 33 districts in the Tennessee Senate. It has been represented by Democrat Sara Kyle since 2015, succeeding her husband, fellow Democrat Jim Kyle.

Geography
District 30 is based in Memphis, covering much of the city's Downtown, North, and East neighborhoods.

The district is located almost entirely within Tennessee's 9th congressional district, with a small section extending into the 8th district. It overlaps with the 83rd, 85th, 86th, 88th, 90th, 93rd, 97th, and 98th districts of the Tennessee House of Representatives.

2020

2016

2014 special
In 2014, Sara Kyle won a special election to succeed her husband, Jim Kyle, who ran for a judge position in Shelby County.

2012
In 2012, redistricting pit 28th district incumbent Jim Kyle against 30th district incumbent Beverly Marrero, a contest Kyle won.

Federal and statewide results in District 30

References 

30
Shelby County, Tennessee